Palak may refer to:
Palak Union Council, Abbottabad District, North-West Frontier Province, Pakistan
 Palak-e Olya, a village in Mazandaran Province, Iran
 Palak-e Sofla, a village in Mazandaran Province, Iran
Palak dïl, a lake in Mizoram
Palak Muchhal, a singer from Indore city in Madhya Pradesh state of India

See also
 Leaf vegetable, spinach, amaranth, or other leaves eaten as a vegetable
 Palak paneer, a vegetarian dish
 Pawlak, a surname